The 1974 Kansas City Royals season was their sixth in Major League Baseball. The Royals finished fifth in the American League West at 77-85, 13 games behind the Oakland Athletics. Pitcher Steve Busby set a single-season franchise record with 22 victories.

Offseason 
 October 24, 1973: Dick Drago was traded by the Royals to the Boston Red Sox for Marty Pattin.
 December 7, 1973: Lou Piniella and Ken Wright were traded by the Royals to the New York Yankees for Lindy McDaniel. Baseball author Bill James called the trade the only clinker the Royals made during the 1970s. 
 January 9, 1974: Mark Souza was drafted by the Royals in the 1st round (17th pick) of the 1974 Major League Baseball draft.

Regular season

Notable transactions 
 April 30, 1974: Paul Schaal was traded by the Royals to the California Angels for Richie Scheinblum.
 June 5, 1974: 1974 Major League Baseball draft
Willie Wilson was drafted by the Royals in the 1st round (18th pick).
Scott Sanderson was drafted by the Royals in the 11th round, but did not sign.
 June 11, 1974: Doug Corbett was signed by the Royals as an amateur free agent.
 August 6, 1974: Orlando Cepeda signed as a free agent by the Royals.
 September 27, 1974: Orlando Cepeda was released by the Royals.

Season standings

Record vs. opponents

Roster

Player stats

Batting

Starters by position 
Note: Pos = Position; G = Games played; AB = At bats; H = Hits; Avg. = Batting average; HR = Home runs; RBI = Runs batted in

Other batters 
Note: G = Games played; AB = At bats; H = Hits; Avg. = Batting average; HR = Home runs; RBI = Runs batted in

Pitching

Starting pitchers 
Note: G = Games pitched; IP = Innings pitched; W = Wins; L = Losses; ERA = Earned run average; SO = Strikeouts

Other pitchers 
Note: G = Games pitched; IP = Innings pitched; W = Wins; L = Losses; ERA = Earned run average; SO = Strikeouts

Relief pitchers 
Note: G = Games pitched; W = Wins; L = Losses; SV = Saves; ERA = Earned run average; SO = Strikeouts

Farm system

Notes

References 

1974 Kansas City Royals at Baseball Reference
1974 Kansas City Royals at Baseball Almanac

Kansas City Royals seasons
Kansas City Royals season
Kansas City